The People's Committees (Inmin Wiwǒnhoe) were a species of largely local committee-government which appeared throughout Korea immediately following the conclusion of the Second World War. These committees existed in their original form from August 1945 to early 1946. By 1948, these participatory grassroots organs of self-government became centralized in the north and purged in the south.

Formation and objectives 

Immediately following the close of the Pacific War, the rapid advance of Soviet troops coupled with an equally rapid retreat from the peninsula by the Japanese colonial forces, left most of Korea with functionally no government. To restore order in the power vacuum as well as to remedy historical grievances, many Korean cities and towns organized their own government counsels. These counsels which were formed throughout the country at first went by different names including 'Committees Preparing for the Restoration of Statehood' and 'National Administration Committees'. By September 1945, however, they were universally called 'People's Political Committees' (inmin chǒnch'i wiwǒnhoe) and then by October they came to be called 'People's Committees'. These Counsels, some electorally determined, some not, featured local notables and community leaders. As much as these People's Committees were unified by their ad hoc characteristics, they varied widely in their specifics by their locality. The People's Committees were not a single, national movement, and therefore there is no single blueprint by which they can be examined. However, the committees in general shared some characteristics. Most of the committees attempted to remove Japanese or Pro-Japanese collaborators from positions of authority. These committees supported workers and peasants, who were collectively deciding on matters related to their work and living conditions. Most people's committees were concerned with the local issues of maintaining order after liberation and protecting food supplies. Most People's committees also attempted some degree of land reform and land redistribution. They seized large land holdings and distributed them to tenants or small holding farmers. The success of the PCs in pursuing these political projects varied widely depending on where the committees were in Korea.

Scale and distribution
The People's Committees were widely distributed in post-liberation Korea. They could be found throughout all of the major provinces and varied widely in their size and influence based on the community of their inception. Committees in small towns were concerned with only local issues whereas more metropolitan committees could have regional or national ambitions. Seoul (CPKI) and Pyongyang People's Committees, for instance, had nationwide influence or formed the seed of the formation of a lasting government in the North respectively. In contrast, The smaller committees were focused almost solely on local issues and politics which were relevant to the countryside. Despite its lower population, the People's Committees were disproportionately powerful in the north of the Country. Especially so in the North East Hamgyŏng provinces which had a long history of small-holding farmers and local autonomy. This was particularly prevalent in North Hamgyŏng Province where more than fifty percent of the peasants were owner-cultivators. Therefore, in the North, the social conditions where much better adapted for the empowerment and survival of popular government groups.

Committees in the North 
People's Committees North of the 38th parallel were proportionally more numerous and more powerful than their counterparts in the south. The demographics of the North featured many more small holding farmers and landlords whose patrimonies where much smaller than their southern equivalents. This meant that the residents of the North were more receptive than those in the south to societal and land reorganization. Indeed, most PCs in the North were able to begin and complete land redistribution before the Soviet occupiers ever arrived. This contrasts sharply with the South where land redistribution would remain an important issue for at least the rest of the 1940s. A "land-to-the-tiller" program was officially promulgated on 5 March 1946, formalizing many of the ad hoc confiscations. 

In June 1946, a Labor Law was instituted calling for an eight hour work day, standardized wage scale, paid annual vacation, collective bargaining rights, and elimination of child labor in hazardous industries. The July 1946 Law of Equal Rights for Men and Women provided equal rights to political participation, economic opportunities, educational opportunities, freedom of choice in marriage, freedom of choice in divorce, and outlawed polygamy and the sale of women as wives or concubines. Major industries, banks, and transportation (many of which had been owned by Japanese occupiers) were nationalized.

The northern committees had a fundamentally different relationship from the southern with both their occupation authorities and their Korean state. The Soviet Occupation forces recognized the PCs and initially tried to work with them. Cho Mansik, a conservative Christian nationalist, was the leader of the South P'yong'an Committee. This was the most important People's Committee in the North of Korea and in the days after liberation he was the most popular and powerful political figure in the North. The Soviets attempted to work with Cho, but in December 1945, at the Moscow Conference, the Soviet Union agreed to a US proposal for a trusteeship over Korea for up to five years. There was widespread opposition across the political spectrum of Korean society towards the partition, and nearly all leftist and conservative nationalists including Cho as well as Kim Gu openly denounced the partition. However, pro-US conservatives under Rhee Syngman and pro-Soviet communists under Kim Il Sung, caved into pressure from the United States and the Soviet Union respectively. Afterwards, in North Korea, Cho was put under house arrest by Soviet authorities and opponents of the partition were removed from positions of power and replaced with pro-Soviet Koreans. 

Once this was accomplished, the Soviet Occupation forces directly integrated the People's Committees into the nascent DPRK. They did this by creating the Provisional People's Committee for North Korea (PPCNK) in February 1946. The PPCNK would be a counsel of all of the PCs throughout the northern provinces and would form the nucleus of the future DPRK. However, this was not a legitimization of the power of the PCs. The People's Committees, once brought under heel by the Soviet occupation forces, were lumped into the state apparatus after being purged of potential reactionaries and subjected to Stalinist style one-candidate elections. The completion of this process by early 1946 is illustrated by the fact that PCs were being used as apparatuses for seizing tax in kind. Since such taxes were one of the most hated aspects of the colonial administration, the trappings of which the PCs tried to erase, this activity on the part of the People's Committees would represent complete loss of popular control. Thereafter, their appearance of populist action and democratic involvement was important in maintaining the electoral facade in the early Democratic People's Republic of Korea, but had little further effect on the state of North Korea.

Orientation 
Local leftists fresh after the liberation struggle were certainly prominent in the counsels formed throughout the country. However, the committees themselves can not be considered to be fundamentally leftist in their inception or their functioning. Before the appointment of Communists by the Soviet occupation, the committees, especially that of Cho's South P'yǒng'an province were mostly headed by conservative nationalists. The people who created the committees didn't necessarily understand the ideology of the burgeoning cold war. They also might not have understood the extreme consequences for appearing to choose the wrong side in the wrong place or time. However, some PCs, notably that of South Hamgyŏng Province, were controlled by seemingly organic leftists prior to Soviet interference. Despite their conservative leanings, almost all People's Committees at least attempted to enact some form of land reform or redistribution to tenants or poorer peasants. This stemmed more from a desire to move away from the long Korean history of unequal access to land and wealth than from Marxist-Leninist ideology. Even the staunchly anti-communist US Military Government and the Rhee regime which followed it attempted some form of land redistribution. This shows that such a project was not necessarily communist. The politics of the Cold War did not define the political orientation of the committees. At most, the politics of communism vs capitalism were circumscribed within the politics of community, or national, concerns.

Historical significance 
Although Koreans north of the 38th parallel played a much more active role the formulation of their new country than those to the south, the orientation they were taking their country to was influenced to a great degree by Soviet political interests.

Committees in the South 
The Southern Occupation Zone was initially home to perhaps the largest and most significant of the PCs, the Committee for the Preparation of Korean Independence (Chosǒn kŏn'guk chunbi wiwǒnhoe, CPKI). The CPKI was founded by Yŏ Unhyŏng and other nationalists in Seoul. This committee had aspirations of becoming an interim national government for Korea. It had, at its greatest reach, 145 peacekeeping forces (ch'iandae) spreading its influence throughout the country. These ch'iandae were not closely controlled by the center. They quickly prioritized local issues such as maintaining access to food and keeping order in they regions to which they were assigned. They did not maintain control by the central CPKI authorities and were gradually integrated into the provincial PCs. The CPKI itself would cease to exist under pressure from the occupation authorities soon thereafter.

The People's Committees south of the 38th Parallel in 1945 found themselves abutting the fiercely anticommunist American occupation forces and the nascent Southern System. The American Occupation was alarmed by the apparent red orientation of the PCs within their zone. Fears of communist control of the PCs and the standing policy of not recognizing pre-existing Korean governments led the occupation forces to ban the People's Committees and outlaw them throughout the American Occupation Zone.

Orientation 
The name of the People's Committees sounds Soviet-Affiliated and would have so sounded in 1945. However, the People's Committees in the South were largely controlled by nationalists who were more interested in creating an independent Korea than they were in the political struggles of the emerging Cold War. Leftists were present on many committees but remained a minority until the committees were dissolved.

Historical significance 
In the South, the dissolution of the People's Committees was the beginning of a decades long struggle on the part of Southern System elites to repress and discredit popular action which they viewed as being pro-communist. The suppression of the PCs therefore helped to establish a precedent of political censorship which would continue, in one form or another, in the South until the democratization movement in the 1980s. The suppression of the PCs also kick-started the violent leftist uprising and the brutal repression which engulfed the South in the years before the Korean War. Therefore, in the South, the legacy of the People's Committees lies in their veterans who either left to the DPRK or stayed south to strengthen the democratization movement which would go on in the ROK for a further four decades.

References

Citations

Sources 

 Armstrong, Charles K. The North Korean Revolution, 1945–1950. Ithaca: Cornell University Press, 2003.
 Hwang, Kyung Moon. A History of Korea: An Episodic Narrative. Houndmills, Basingstoke, Hampshire: Palgrave Macmillan, 2010.
 Lankov, A. N. From Stalin to Kim Il Sung: The Formation of North Korea, 1945–1960. New Brunswick, N.J.: Rutgers University Press, 2002.

South Korean democracy movements
Government of Korea